The 35th Australian Film Institute Awards (generally known as the AFI Awards) were held on 5 November 1993.  Presented by the Australian Film Institute (AFI), the awards celebrated the best in Australian feature film, documentary, short film and television productions of 1993.

Eighteen feature films were nominated. Jane Campion's The Piano dominated the feature film awards with eleven awards including Best Film. Blackfellas won two awards for adapted screenplay and actor in a supporting role, and On My Own received a single award for actress in a supporting role. Television awards were shared between various productions such as miniseries The Leaving of Liverpool and drama series Phoenix and G.P.. Producer Sue Milliken received the Raymond Longford Award for lifetime achievement.

Winners and nominees
Winners are listed first and highlighted in boldface.

Feature film

Television

Non-feature film

Additional awards

References

External links
 The Australian Film Institute | Australian Academy of Cinema and Television Arts official website

AACTA Awards ceremonies
AACTA Awards
AACTA Awards
AACTA Awards
AACTA Awards